Xcalak is a village of 375 inhabitants in the municipality of Othón P. Blanco, Quintana Roo, on the Caribbean coast of Mexico. It is one of the last "unspoiled" stretches of the Mexican Caribbean located on the southern end of the Costa Maya. The world's second largest barrier reef passes just off-shore from Xcalak and it is also a departure point for dive trips to the Chinchorro Bank (Banco Chinchorro) atoll reef system. It is designated a Mexican national reef park (Parque Nacional Arrecifes de Xcalak) and is an excellent site for snorkeling, scuba diving and fly fishing. The Mahahual pier was destroyed by hurricane Dean in 2007. This section of coast is now being developed by the tourism industry and has a growing number of Americans and other expatriates investing in beach front property north of town. However, development is nowhere close to the degree of development in Cancún and Playa del Carmen to the north.

History
The first settlements in the region date from the Pre-Columbian era. Nearby are the ruins of the Mayan city of Xcalak, from which the town derives its name.

In May 1900, the Mexican Navy established the villa of Xcalak as a control post for the region. There the first shipyard of the Mexican Caribbean was constructed.

During the twentieth century, the area became a major population area, with a significant production of coconut from coco palm plantations that reached up to 300 tons monthly. In 1955, the city was whipped by Hurricane Janet, which destroyed a large part of the town and scattered the population to other areas.

Climate
Xcalak was the largest city in Quintana Roo until it was destroyed by Hurricane Janet in 1955. Hurricane Dean struck Majahual, only 50 kilometers north of Xcalak in 2007.

External links

References

Populated places in Quintana Roo